Kalus (also Romanized as Kalūs; also known as Kūlūs) is a village in Sokmanabad Rural District, Safayyeh District, Khoy County, West Azerbaijan Province, Iran. At the 2006 census, its population was 106, in 19 families.

References 

Populated places in Khoy County